Kyra is a village located in the Nicosia District of Cyprus, 6 km east of Morphou. De facto, it is under the control of Northern Cyprus.

Originally inhabited by Greek Cypriots, since the Turkish invasion in 1974, the village has been solely inhabited by Turks. The Church of Panagia is used by the Turkish army as a depot.

References

Communities in Nicosia District
Populated places in Güzelyurt District
Greek Cypriot villages depopulated during the 1974 Turkish invasion of Cyprus